The Bombardier Challenger 300 is a  range business jet made by Bombardier Aerospace.

Announced at the 1999 Paris Air Show, it made its maiden flight on 14 August 2001, received its Canadian type approval on 31 May 2003 and was introduced on 8 January 2004.

The Challenger 350 is a slightly improved  range variant which first flew on 2 March 2013 and was approved on 11 June 2014.

Around 450 Challenger 300 have been delivered, and 350 Challenger 350 by July 2020.

Development

Challenger 300
The baseline Challenger 300 was launched at the 1999 Paris Air Show as the Bombardier Continental. An all-new design, it received Transport Canada type approval on 31 May 2003, followed on 4 June by US FAR 25 certification and on 31 July by European JAR 25 approval. Assembled in Wichita, Kansas, it entered commercial service on 8 January 2004 with Flexjet. The new design is not developed from the Challenger 600 or its variants.

Its supercritical wings have a fixed leading-edge and a 27% sweep angle, its  winglets reduce cruise lift-induced drag by 17%.

It climbs to FL410 in 18 min with a  fuel burn at MTOW/ISA, where at a  weight it burns /h at Mach 0.8/ tas, /h at Mach 0.83/ tas.
In 2004, the unit cost of the Challenger 300 was US$17.4 million.

The fuselage and the wing are semi-monocoque aluminum structures, the winglets are composite.

Outboard ailerons are manually actuated, elevators and rudder are hydraulic with a mechanical backup, fly-by-wire spoilers augment roll control, act as speedbrakes and dump lift on the ground, hydraulic single-slotted fowler flap have four positions: 0/10/20/30°.

The Rockwell Collins Pro Line 21 avionics include four LCD displays, an EICAS and Maintenance Diagnostics Computer, an EGPWS, a TCAS II and an ELT.

Challenger 350

The improved variant first flew on March 2, 2013, was unveiled at the next May EBACE and was due to enter service in May 2014. Combined with a more luxurious interior and 20% taller cabin windows, it costs $1 million more at $25.9 million. Its launch customer, NetJets, ordered 75 firm and 125 options.
It received its type certification from Transport Canada on June 11, 2014, from the FAA on June 25 and from the EASA on September 2.
In 2018, 60 Challenger 350s were delivered as Bombardier claims a 58% market share of the super mid-size segment, and the 300th delivery was reached in July 2019, after five years of service.

A strengthened wing with canted winglets and more span allows for  more full fuel payload.

Bombardier maintenance program runs $277 per hour and inspection intervals are at 600 hr.

The avionics include four Adaptive LCD Displays, Dual FMS with LPV and RNP approaches capability, SVS, a MultiScan,  Weather Radar, Dual IRS, dual SBAS GPS, integrated EFIS and dual VHF and HF radios.

It is able to carry eight passengers over a 3,200 nmi / 5,926 km range at a Mach 0.80 (459 kn, 849 km/h) long-range cruise. It is manufactured in Canada.

In 2021, its equipped price was $26.7M.

Challenger 3500

Bombardier unveiled the Challenger 3500 at an event in Montreal on September 14, 2021 which builds on the Challenger 300/350.  The 3500 will feature improvements such as auto- throttles, and an upgraded cabin.  The new name will also bring the Challenger 3500 inline with Bombardier's Global nomenclature.  Bombardier anticipates deliveries of the Challenger 3500 the second half of 2022 and will carry a price tag of $26.7 million, which is the same as the current Challenger 350.

Operational history
In November 2014, for nearly one million hours of operations, the 448 Challenger 300 in service had a 99.79% dispatch reliability rate; five-year-old aircraft retain 64% of their original value. At the end of 2015,  Challenger 300/350 were in service: 402 in North America, 75 in Western Europe,  37 in Latin America, 12 in Eastern Europe, seven in India, six in Africa and China, four in Asia Pacific and one in the Middle East; the largest operator was Flexjet with 30 Challenger 300s and seven 350s, then Netjets with 26 delivered, including four to Netjets Europe.

In 2017, facing competition, Bombardier discounted the price of the Challenger 300/350 by $7 million to match the Embraer Legacy 500's $20 million price.
Over 200 Challenger 350 were delivered by December 2017, adding to around 450  Challenger 300 deliveries.
The 350th Challenger 350 was delivered in July 2020.

Second-hand Challenger 300s typically cost from $7 million to over $20 million.

Specifications

See also
Bombardier Challenger 600

References

External links

 
 
 
 

2000s Canadian business aircraft
Challenger 300
Twinjets
T-tail aircraft
Aircraft first flown in 2001
Low-wing aircraft